The 1985 NCAA Division I women's basketball tournament began on March 14 and ended on March 31 and featured 32 teams. The Final Four consisted of Old Dominion, Northeast Louisiana, Western Kentucky, and Georgia, with Old Dominion defeating Georgia, 70–65 in the championship game.  Old Dominion's Tracy Claxton was named the Most Outstanding Player of the tournament.

1985 is the first year ESPN began televising some of the Tournament games. They televised two of the four Regional finals (East and West Regional), as well as the two national semifinals. The Georgia vs Western Kentucky match up was shown live, while the Old Dominion vs. Northeast Louisiana game was shown tape-delayed. The Championship game was broadcast by CBS.

Notable events
Georgia faced Western Kentucky in the semi-final. This was a rematch of a game played in December, when Western Kentucky prevailed, 72–67. However, in that game, Katrina McClain had been sidelined with an ankle injury. She was available to play in the Final Four, and achieved a career high total of 25 points. Her teammate, Teresa Edwards, scored 27, and the two helped Georgia win the semi-final 91–78.

In the championship game, Georgia took on Old Dominion. The Lady Monarchs weren't hitting their shots, scoring on only 38% of their field goal attempts, but they made up for their misses with rebounds. The Old Dominion team had set an NCAA Final Four record (still standing in 2012) with 57 rebounds in the semi-final game, and they repeated that performance in the championship game, pulling down 57 rebounds and limiting Georgia to 30. The game would be close, but Old Dominion prevailed, 70–65, to win the national Championship.

Records
In the second half of the semi-final game between Georgia and Western Kentucky, Georgia scored 57 points while Western Kentucky scored 44. The combined point total of 101 points in a half, as well as the points scored by a single team in a half are both Final Four records, still standing in 2012.

In the other semi-final game, Old Dominion pulled down 57 rebounds against Northeast Louisiana. That number still stands as a Final Four rebounds record, although it was tied two days later by Old Dominion in the championship game against Georgia.

In a first-round game, Teresa Carmichael of Saint Joseph's University, attempted eleven field goals and hit all eleven. That's the most number of field goal attempts without a miss in tournament history, though 2012.

Qualifying teams – automatic
Thirty-two teams were selected to participate in the 1985 NCAA Tournament. Eighteen conferences were eligible for an automatic bid to the 1985 NCAA tournament.

Qualifying teams – at-large
Fourteen additional teams were selected to complete the thirty-two invitations.

Bids by conference

Bids by state

The thirty-two teams came from twenty-one states.
California and Tennessee had the most teams with four each.  Twenty-nine states did not have any teams receiving bids.

Round 1 venues
The 32 teams were seeded, and assigned to four geographic regions, with seeds 1-8 in each region. In  Round 1, the higher seed was given the opportunity to host the first-round game. In each case, the higher seed accepted the opportunity.

Regionals and Final Four

The regionals, named  for the general location, were held from March 21 to March 24 at these sites:

 East Regional  Old Dominion University Fieldhouse, Norfolk, Virginia (Host: Old Dominion University)
 Midwest Regional  Ewing Coliseum, Monroe, Louisiana (Host: Northeast Louisiana University)
 Mideast Regional  E.A. Diddle Arena, Bowling Green, Kentucky (Host: Western Kentucky University)
 West Regional  Pauley Pavilion, Los Angeles, California (Host: University of California, Los Angeles)

Each regional winner  advanced to the Final Four held March 29 and March 31 in Austin, Texas at the  Frank Erwin Center

Brackets

East regional – Old Dominion – Norfolk, VA (Old Dominion University Fieldhouse)

Midwest regional – Northeast Louisiana University – Monroe, LA(Fant–Ewing Coliseum)

Mideast regional – Western Kentucky University, Bowling Green, KY (E. A. Diddle Arena)

West regional – UCLA, Los Angeles, CA (Pauley Pavilion)

Final Four – University of Texas – Austin, Texas (Frank Erwin Center)

Record by  conference
Eleven conferences had more than one bid,  or at least one win in NCAA Tournament play:

Nine conferences went  0-1: Big East, Big Eight,  High Country, MAAC, MAC, Missouri Valley Conference, Mountain West, Northern Pacific, and Pacific Coast

All-Tournament team

 Tracy Claxton, Old Dominion University
 Medina Dixon, Old Dominion University
 Teresa Edwards, University of Georgia
 Katrina McClain, University of Georgia
 Lillie Mason, Western Kentucky University

Game officials

 Bob Olsen (semifinal)
 John Schleyer (semifinal)
 June Courteau (semifinal, final)
 Bill Stokes (semifinal, final)

See also
1985 NCAA Division I men's basketball tournament
1985 NCAA Division II women's basketball tournament
1985 NCAA Division III women's basketball tournament
1985 NAIA women's basketball tournament

Notes

 
NCAA Division I women's basketball tournament
NCAA Division I women's basketball tournament
NCAA Division I women's basketball tournament
Basketball competitions in Austin, Texas
Women's sports in Texas
College sports tournaments in Texas